The Indigo King, released on October 21, 2008, is the third book of The Chronicles of the Imaginarium Geographica, a series of books begun by Here, There Be Dragons, by James A. Owen. It follows The Search for the Red Dragon and precedes The Shadow Dragons, which was released in October 2009.

Plot
Five years after their prior adventure, John (J.R.R. Tolkien) and Jack (C.S. Lewis) are joined by Hugo Dyson and Owen Barfield. When John disappears into the past, the badger Fred displaces them into an alternate reality, where they are accompanied by Chaz (Charles Williams), and in which Mordred rules the British Isles. Chaz leads the group to Bert (H. G. Wells), who gives John a skull of the deceased Jules Verne, a map, and the 'Serendipity Box' which grants its user the object most in need. Mordred then imprisons the men and badgers and departs, whereupon the badger Uncas releases the men and Bert creates an ocean and summons the ship Red Dragon, on which the protagonists depart. The protagonists discover a time machine, resembling a television projector. The first slide is of Ancient Greece, where the companions discover twins Myrddyn and Madoc and deduce that one is the Cartographer of Lost Places and the other Mordred. In the next slide, the protagonists find Meridian (Myrddyn) and discover a priestess identified as the Holy Grail, in the Library of Alexandria. In departure Chaz mistakenly destroys the Library.

In the third slide, they re-unite with Hugo and witness the 'Tournament of Champions' to determine the next ruler of Meridian's Precinct (Britain). The three entrants are Merlin; Mordred; and Thorn, a boy destined to become King Arthur. Hugo disqualifies Merlin and Mordred, and Thorn becomes Arthur; but does not command the loyalty of the people. In the fourth slide, Mordred has allied with Arthur but kills him in a dispute and breaks Caliburn. They visit Avalon, where Chaz becomes the first Green Knight and receives the Lance of Longinus. Arthur is revived by the Grail's daughter, Rose, who cuts off Mordred's hand when he attempts to kill Merlin. Arthur summons dragons to unite the subordinate kings, while Merlin becomes the Cartographer. In the fifth slide, they meet Geoffrey of Monmouth, and visit the Keep of Time, where the Cartographer gives them a key to the Keep's topmost room.

The protagonists emerge from the door they first entered and hear from Richard Burton that he sent Hugo into the past to prove Mordred a victim of fate. In a pre-World War II setting, it is hinted that Mordred has rediscovered the Lance of Longinus and is ready to attack the Archipelago.

2008 American novels
The Chronicles of the Imaginarium Geographica
Modern Arthurian fiction
American fantasy novels
Fiction set in 1916